The ZX Spectrum is an 8-bit home computer that was developed by Sinclair Research. It was released in the United Kingdom on 23 April 1982, and became Britain's best-selling microcomputer.

Referred to during development as the ZX81 Colour and ZX82, it was launched as the ZX Spectrum to highlight the machine's colour display, which differed from the black and white display of its predecessor, the ZX81. The Spectrum was released as six different models, ranging from the entry level with 16 KB RAM released in 1982 to the ZX Spectrum +3 with 128 KB RAM and built in floppy disk drive in 1987; altogether they sold over 5 million units worldwide (not counting unofficial clones).

The Spectrum was among the first home computers in the United Kingdom aimed at a mainstream audience, and it thus had similar significance to the Commodore 64 in the US and the Thomson MO5 in France. The introduction of the ZX Spectrum led to a boom in companies producing software and hardware for the machine, the effects of which are still seen. Some credit it as the machine which launched the British information technology industry. Licensing deals and clones followed, earning Clive Sinclair a knighthood for services to British industry.

The Commodore 64, Dragon 32, Oric-1, Oric Atmos, BBC Micro and later the Amstrad CPC range were rivals to the Spectrum in the UK market during the early 1980s. The machine was officially discontinued in 1992.

Hardware 

The Spectrum is based on a Zilog Z80, a CPU running at 3.5 MHz (or NEC D780C-1 clone). The original model has 16 KB (16×1024 bytes) of ROM and either 16 KB or 48 KB of RAM. Hardware design was by Richard Altwasser of Sinclair Research, and the outward appearance was designed by Sinclair's industrial designer Rick Dickinson.

Video output is through an RF modulator and was designed for use with contemporary television sets, for a simple colour graphic display. Text can be displayed using 32 columns × 24 rows of characters from the ZX Spectrum character set or from a set provided within an application, from a palette of 15 shades: seven colours at two levels of brightness each, plus black. The image resolution is 256×192 with the same colour limitations. To conserve memory, colour is stored separate from the pixel bitmap in a low resolution, 32×24 grid overlay, corresponding to the character cells. In practice, this means that all pixels of an 8x8 character block share one foreground colour and one background colour. Altwasser received a patent for this design.

An "attribute" consists of a foreground and a background colour, a brightness level (normal or bright) and a flashing "flag" which, when set, causes the two colours to swap at regular intervals. This scheme leads to what was dubbed colour clash or attribute clash, where a desired colour of a specific pixel could not necessarily be selected. This became a distinctive feature of the Spectrum, meaning programs, particularly games, had to be designed around this limitation. Other machines available around the same time, for example the Amstrad CPC or the Commodore 64, did not suffer from this limitation. The Commodore 64 used colour attributes in a similar way, but a special multicolour mode and hardware sprites were used to avoid attribute clash.

Sound output is through a beeper on the machine itself, capable of producing one channel with 10 octaves. Software was later available that could play two channel sound. The machine includes an expansion bus edge connector and 3.5 mm audio in/out ports for the connection of a cassette recorder for loading and saving programs and data. The "ear" port has a higher output than the "mic" and is recommended for headphones, with "mic" for attaching to other audio devices as line in.

The machine was manufactured in Dundee, Scotland, in the now closed Timex factory.

Firmware 

The machine's Sinclair BASIC interpreter is stored in ROM (along with fundamental system-routines) and was written by Steve Vickers on contract from Nine Tiles Ltd. The Spectrum's chiclet keyboard (on top of a membrane, similar to calculator keys) is marked with BASIC keywords. For example, pressing "G" when in programming mode would insert the BASIC command GO TO.

The BASIC interpreter was developed from that used on the ZX81 and a ZX81 BASIC program can be typed into a Spectrum largely unmodified, but Spectrum BASIC included many extra features making it easier to use. The ZX Spectrum character set was expanded from that of the ZX81, which did not feature lower-case letters. Spectrum BASIC included extra keywords for the more advanced display and sound, and supported multi-statement lines. The cassette interface was much more advanced, saving and loading around five times faster than the ZX81 (1500 bits per second compared to 307), and unlike the ZX81, the Spectrum could maintain the TV display during tape storage and retrieval operations. As well as being able to save programs, the Spectrum could save the contents of arrays, the contents of the screen memory, and the contents of any defined range of memory addresses.

Sinclair Research models

Pre-production designs 

Rick Dickinson came up with a number of designs for the "ZX82" project before the final ZX Spectrum design. A number of the keyboard legends changed during the design phase including ARC becoming CIRCLE, FORE becoming INK and BACK becoming PAPER. The Spectrum reused a number of design elements of the ZX81: The ROM code for things such as floating point calculations and expression parsing were very similar (with a few obsolete ZX81 routines left in the Spectrum ROM). The simple keyboard decoding and cassette interfaces were nearly identical (although the latter was now programmed to load/save at a higher speed). The central ULA integrated circuit was somewhat similar although it implemented the major enhancement over the ZX81: A (fully) hardware based television raster generator (with colour) that indirectly gave the new machine approximately four times as much processing power as the ZX81, simply due to the Z80 now being released from this video generation task. A bug in the ULA as originally designed meant that the keyboard did not always scan correctly, and was rectified by a "dead cockroach" (a small circuit board mounted upside down next to the CPU) for Issue 1 ZX Spectrums.

ZX Spectrum 16K/48K 

The original ZX Spectrum is remembered for its rubber chiclet keyboard, diminutive size and distinctive rainbow motif. Owners of the 16 KB model could purchase an internal 32 KB RAM upgrade, which for early "Issue 1" machines consisted of a daughterboard. Later issue machines required the fitting of 8 dynamic RAM chips and a few TTL chips. Users could mail their 16K Spectrums to Sinclair to be upgraded to 48 KB versions. Later revisions contained 64 KB of memory but were configured such that only 48 KB were usable. External 32 KB RAM packs that mounted in the rear expansion slot were available from third parties. Both machines had 16 KB of onboard ROM.

An "Issue 1" ZX Spectrum can be distinguished from later models by the colour of the keys – light grey for Issue 1, blue-grey for later machines. Although the official service manual states that approximately 26,000 of these original boards were manufactured, subsequent serial number analysis shows that only 16,000 were produced, almost all of which fell in the serial number range 001-000001 to 001-016000. An online tool now exists to allow users to ascertain the likely issue number of their ZX Spectrum by inputting the serial number.

The Sinclair models featured audio line in and out, in the form of an "ear" and "mic" socket. An external tape recorder was needed to load the majority of software released, or the ZX Microdrive. Either socket could be connected to headphones or an amplifier as an audio output, although this would not disable the internal speaker.

The original ZX Spectrum model experienced numerous changes to its motherboard design; mainly to improve manufacturing efficiencies, but also to correct bugs from previous boards. Another issue was with the Spectrum's power supply. In March 1983, Sinclair issued an "URGENT" recall warning for all owners of models bought after 1 January 1983. Plugs with a plain (rather than textured) surface were at risk of causing shock, and were asked to be sent back to Sinclair's office in Broad Lane, Cottenham. It's not known how many power supplies were returned, and how many still exist in the wild.

Sales of the Spectrum reached 200,000 in its first nine months rising to 300,000 for the whole of the first year. By August 1983 total sales in the UK and Europe had exceeded 500,000 with the millionth Spectrum manufactured on December 9th.

ZX Spectrum+ 

Planning of the ZX Spectrum+ started in June 1984, and was released on October 15. This 48 KB Spectrum (development code-name TB) introduced a new QL-style case with an injection-moulded keyboard and a reset button that was basically a switch that shorted across the CPU reset capacitor. Electronically, it was identical to the previous 48 KB model. It was possible to change the system boards between the original case and the Spectrum+ case. A DIY conversion-kit for older machines was available. Early on, the machine outsold the rubber-key model 2:1; however, some retailers reported a failure rate of up to 30%, compared with a more usual 5–6% for the older model.

ZX Spectrum 128 

In 1985, Sinclair developed the ZX Spectrum 128 (code-named Derby) in conjunction with their Spanish distributor Investrónica (a subsidiary of El Corte Inglés department store group). Investrónica had helped adapt the ZX Spectrum+ to the Spanish market after the Spanish government introduced a special tax on all computers with 64 KB RAM or less, and a law which obliged all computers sold in Spain to support the Spanish alphabet and show messages in Spanish.

The appearance of the ZX Spectrum 128 was similar to the ZX Spectrum+, with the exception of a large external heatsink for the internal 7805 voltage regulator added to the right hand end of the case, replacing the internal heatsink in previous versions. This external heatsink led to the system's nickname, "The Toast Rack".

New features included 128 KB RAM with RAM disc commands 'save !"name"', three-channel audio via the AY-3-8912 chip, MIDI compatibility, an RS-232 serial port, an RGB monitor port, 32 KB of ROM including an improved BASIC editor, and an external keypad.

The machine was simultaneously presented for the first time and launched in September 1985 at the SIMO '85 trade show in Spain, with a price of 44,250 pesetas. No external keypad was available for the UK release, although the ROM routines to use it and the port itself remained.

The Z80 processor used in the Spectrum has a 16-bit address bus, which means only 64 KB of memory can be directly addressed. To facilitate the extra 80 KB of RAM the designers used bank switching so the new memory would be available as eight pages of 16 KB at the top of the address space. The same technique was used to page between the new 16 KB editor ROM and the original 16 KB BASIC ROM at the bottom of the address space.

The new sound chip and MIDI out abilities were exposed to the BASIC programming language with the command PLAY and a new command SPECTRUM was added to switch the machine into 48K mode, keeping the current BASIC program intact (although there is no command to switch back to 128K mode). To enable BASIC programmers to access the additional memory, a RAM disk was created where files could be stored in the additional 80 KB of RAM. The new commands took the place of two existing user-defined-character spaces causing compatibility problems with certain BASIC programs.

The ZX Spectrum 128 had no internal speaker, unlike its predecessors. Sound was produced from the television speaker instead.

The Spanish version had the "128K" logo in white; the British one had the same logo in red.

Amstrad models

ZX Spectrum +2 

The ZX Spectrum +2 was Amstrad's first Spectrum, coming shortly after their purchase of the Spectrum range and "Sinclair" brand in 1986. The machine featured an all-new grey case featuring a spring-loaded keyboard, dual joystick ports, and a built-in cassette recorder dubbed the "Datacorder" (like the Amstrad CPC 464), but was in most respects identical to the ZX Spectrum 128. The main menu screen lacked the Spectrum 128's "Tape Test" option, and the ROM was altered to account for a new 1986 Amstrad copyright message. Production costs had been reduced and the retail price dropped to £139–£149.

The new keyboard did not include the BASIC keyword markings that were found on earlier Spectrums, except for the keywords LOAD, CODE and RUN which were useful for loading software. Instead, the +2 boasted a menu system, almost identical to the ZX Spectrum 128, where one could switch between 48K BASIC programming with the keywords, and 128K BASIC programming in which all words (keywords and otherwise) must be typed out in full (although the keywords are still stored internally as one character each). Despite these changes, the layout remained identical to that of the 128.

The ZX Spectrum +2 power supply was a grey version of the ZX Spectrum+ and 128 power supply.

ZX Spectrum +3 

The ZX Spectrum +3, released in 1987, looked similar to the +2A but featured a built-in 3-inch floppy disk drive (like the Amstrad CPC 6128) instead of the tape drive, and was in a black case. It was launched in 1987, initially retailed for £249 and then later £199 and was the only Spectrum capable of running the CP/M operating system without additional hardware.

The +3 saw the addition of two more 16 KB ROMs. One was home to the second part of the reorganised 128 ROM and the other hosted the +3's disk operating system. This was a modified version of Amstrad's PCWDOS (the disk access code used in LocoScript), called +3DOS. These two new 16 KB ROMs and the original two 16 KB ROMs were now physically implemented together as two 32 KB chips. To be able to run CP/M, which requires RAM at the bottom of the address space, the bank-switching was further improved, allowing the ROM to be paged out for another 16 KB of RAM.

Such core changes brought incompatibilities:

 Removal of several lines on the expansion bus edge connector (video, power, and IORQGE); caused many external devices problems; some such as the VTX5000 modem could be used via the "FixIt" device.
 Dividing ROMCS into two lines, to disable both ROMs.
 Reading a non-existent I/O port no longer returned the last attribute; caused certain games such as Arkanoid to be unplayable.
 Memory timing changes; certain RAM banks were now contended causing high-speed colour-changing effects to fail.
 The keypad scanning routines from the ROM were removed.

Some older 48K and 128K games were incompatible with the machine. The ZX Interface 1 was incompatible due to differences in ROM and expansion connector, making it impossible to connect and use the Microdrive units.

Unlike previous models, the ZX Spectrum +3 power supply uses a DIN connector and has "Sinclair +3" written on the case. The same power supply could also be used with the later +2A/B models.

Production of the +3 ceased in December 1990, believed to be in response to Amstrad relaunching their CPC range. At the time, it was estimated about 15% of ZX Spectrums sold had been +3 models. Production of the +2B (the only other model then still in production) continued, as it was believed not to be in competition with other computers in Amstrad's product range.

ZX Spectrum +2A 

The ZX Spectrum +2A was a new version of the Spectrum +2 using the same circuit board as the Spectrum +3. It was sold from late 1988 and unlike the original grey +2 was housed inside a black case. The Spectrum +2A/+3 motherboard (AMSTRAD part number Z70830) was designed so that it could be assembled with a +2 style "datacorder" connected instead of the floppy disk controller. Amstrad planned to introduce an additional disk interface for the +2A/+2B called the AMSTRAD SI-1, but it never appeared. If an external disk drive was added, the "+2A" displayed on the system menu text would change to "+3".

The power supply of the ZX Spectrum +2A used the same pinout as the +3 and has "Sinclair +2" written on the case.

ZX Spectrum +2B and +3B 

The ZX Spectrum +2B and ZX Spectrum +3B were functionally similar in design to the Spectrum +2A and +3. The main electronic differences were changes to the generation of the audio output signal to resolve problems with clipping.

Unlike the +2A and +3, the Spectrum +2B and +3B do not share a common motherboard.
The +2B board (AMSTRAD part number Z70833) has no provision for floppy disk controller circuitry and the +3B motherboard (Amstrad part number Z70835) has no provision for connecting an internal tape drive. Production of all Amstrad Spectrum models ended in 1992.

Clones and re-creations

Official clones 

Sinclair licensed the Spectrum design to Timex Corporation in the United States, that sold several machines under the Timex Sinclair brand. An enhanced version of the original Spectrum, with better sound, graphics and other modifications was marketed in the US by Timex as the Timex Sinclair 2068. Timex's derivatives were largely incompatible with Sinclair systems. Some of the Timex innovations were later adopted by Sinclair Research. A case in point was the abortive Pandora portable Spectrum, whose ULA had the high resolution video mode pioneered in the T/S 2068. Pandora had a flat-screen monitor and Microdrives and was intended to be Sinclair's business portable. After Amstrad bought the computer business of Sinclair Research, Sir Clive retained the rights to the Pandora project, and it evolved into the Cambridge Computer Z88, launched in 1987.

Starting in 1984, Timex of Portugal developed and produced several Timex branded computers, including the Timex Computer 2048, highly compatible with the Sinclair ZX Spectrum 48K, which was very successful in both Portugal and Poland. An NTSC version was also made, initially intended for a United States release, but it was sold only in Chile, Ecuador and Argentina. Timex of Portugal also made a PAL version of the T/S 2068, called the Timex Computer 2068 (or TC 2068 for short) which had different buffers for both the ULA and the CPU, which significantly increased the compatibility with ZX Spectrum software when compared to the North American model (the T/S 2068). The expansion port was also modified and made to be 100% compatible with the ZX Spectrum's, which bypassed the need for a "Twister Board" expansion that the T/S 2068 needed to make it compatible with ZX Spectrum expansion hardware. It also had the AY sound output routed to the monitor/TV speakers instead of the internal twitter. The software developed for the TC 2068 is completely compatible with the T/S 2068, since the ROMs weren't altered. Timex of Portugal also developed a ZX Spectrum "emulator" on cartridge form that mapped the first 16 KB exactly like the earlier TC 2048 computer did. Several other upgrades were made available, including a BASIC64 cartridge that enabled the TC 2068 to use high resolution (512x192) modes. Despite having an AY-3-8912 sound chip, it's not connected in the same ports as in the ZX Spectrum 128K, rendering the TC 2048 incompatible with the AY sound that the Spectrum 128K games produced. Due to all its advantages compared to the usual T/S 2068, a North American company, Zebra Systems, licensed the Timex TC 2068 and sold it in the United States as the Zebra Silver Avenger. They also sold the FDD 3000 as the Zebra FDD 3000 in a silver case (as opposed to the European black cases) to match their colour scheme. Timex of Portugal was working on a successor to the TC 2068 called the TC 3256, using a Z80A CPU and featuring 256 KB of RAM, which would feature a ZX Spectrum BASIC operating mode and a CP/M operating mode, but the company pulled the plug on its development as the 8-bit market was no longer profitable by the end of 1989. Only one complete and fully working prototype of the TC 3256 was made.

In India, Deci Bells Electronics Limited introduced a licensed version of the Spectrum+ in 1988. Dubbed the "dB Spectrum+", it did reasonably well in the Indian market, selling over 50000 units and achieving an 80% market share.

Unofficial clones 

Numerous unofficial Spectrum clones were produced, especially in the Eastern and Central European countries (e.g. in USSR (called ), Romania, and Czechoslovakia) where several models were produced (such as the Tim-S, HC85, HC91, Cobra, Junior, CIP, CIP 3, Jet, Didaktik Gama), some featuring CP/M and a 5.25"/3.5" floppy disk.

There were also clones produced in South America (e.g. Microdigital TK90X and TK95, made in Brazil and the Czerweny CZ, made in Argentina). In the Soviet Union, ZX Spectrum clones were assembled by thousands of small start-ups and distributed through poster ads and street stalls. Over 50 such clone models existed. Some of them are still being produced, such as the Pentagon and ATM Turbo.

In the UK, Spectrum peripheral vendor Miles Gordon Technology (MGT) released the SAM Coupé as a potential successor with some Spectrum compatibility. By this point, the Amiga and Atari ST had taken hold of the market, leaving MGT in eventual receivership.

Recreations 

In 2013, an FPGA-based redesign of the original ZX Spectrum known as the ZX Uno, was formally announced. All of its hardware, firmware and software are open source, released as Creative Commons license Share-alike. The use of a Spartan FPGA allows the system to not only re-implement the ZX Spectrum, but many other 8 bit computers and games consoles The device can also run modern open FPGA machines such as the Chloe 280SE. The Uno was successfully crowdfunded in 2016 and the first boards went on sale during the same year.

In January 2014, Elite Systems, who produced a successful range of software for the original ZX Spectrum in the 1980s, announced plans for a Spectrum-themed bluetooth keyboard that would attach to mobile devices. The company used a crowdfunding campaign to fund the Recreated ZX Spectrum, which would be compatible with games the company had already released on iTunes and Google Play. Elite Systems took down its Spectrum Collection application the following month, due to complaints from authors of the original 1980's game software that they had not been paid for the content. Wired described the finished device, which was styled as an original Spectrum 48k keyboard, as "absolutely gorgeous" but said it was ultimately more of an expensive novelty than an actual Spectrum. In July 2019, Eurogamer reported that many of the orders had yet to be delivered due to a dispute between Elite Systems and their manufacturer, Eurotech.

Later in 2014, the Sinclair ZX Spectrum Vega retro video game console was announced by Retro Computers Ltd and crowdfunded on Indiegogo with the backing of Clive Sinclair. The Vega, released in 2015, took the form of a handheld TV game but the lack of a full keyboard led to criticism from reviewers due to the large number of text adventures supplied with the device. Most reviewers branded the device cheap and uncomfortable to use

The follow-up, the ZX Spectrum Vega+ was designed as a handheld game console. Despite reaching its crowdfunding target in March 2016, the company failed to fulfil the majority of orders. On 30 July 2018, Eurogamer reported that one backer had received a ZX Vega+ console and quoted them as being "quite disappointed" that "the few supplied sample games don't work" and that the "build quality's not the greatest". Reviewing the Vega+, The Register criticised numerous aspects and features of the machine, including its design and build quality and summed up by saying that the "entire feel is plasticky and inconsequential". Retro Computers Ltd was wound up on 1 February 2019.

The ZX Spectrum Next (not to be confused with the older, two-processor ZX Next) is an expanded and updated version of the ZX Spectrum computer implemented with FPGA technology funded by a Kickstarter campaign in April 2017, with the board-only computer delivered to backers later that year. The finished machine, including a case designed by Rick Dickinson who died during the development of the project, was released to backers in February 2020. MagPi called it "a lovely piece of kit", noting that it is "well-designed and well-built: authentic to the original, and with technology that nods to the past while remaining functional and relevant in the modern age". PC Pro magazine called the Next "undeniably impressive" while noting that the printed manual lacked an index, and that some features are "not quite ready". A further Kickstarter for an improved revision of the hardware was funded in August 2020.

Peripherals 

Several peripherals were marketed by Sinclair: the ZX Printer was already on the market, as the ZX Spectrum expansion bus was partially backwards-compatible with that of the ZX81.

The ZX Interface 1 add-on module included 8 KB of ROM, an RS-232 serial port, a proprietary LAN interface (called ZX Net), and an interface for the connection of up to eight ZX Microdrives – somewhat unreliable but speedy tape-loop cartridge storage devices released in July 1983. These were used in a revised version on the Sinclair QL, whose storage format was electrically compatible but logically incompatible with the Spectrum's. Sinclair also released the ZX Interface 2 which added two joystick ports and a ROM cartridge port.

There were a plethora of third-party hardware addons. The better known of these included the Kempston joystick interface, the Morex Peripherals Centronics/RS-232 interface, the Currah Microspeech unit (speech synthesis), Videoface Digitiser, RAM pack, the Cheetah Marketing SpecDrum, a drum machine, and the Multiface, a snapshot and disassembly tool from Romantic Robot. Keyboards were especially popular in view of the original's notorious "dead flesh" feel.

There were disk drive interfaces, such as the Abbeydale Designers/Watford Electronics SPDOS, Abbeydale Designers/Kempston KDOS and Opus Discovery. The SPDOS and KDOS interfaces were the first to come bundled with office productivity software (Tasword Word Processor, Masterfile database and Omnicalc spreadsheet). This bundle, together with OCP's Stock Control, Finance and Payroll systems, introduced small businesses to a streamlined, computerised operation. The most popular floppy disk systems (except in East Europe) were the DISCiPLE and +D systems released by Miles Gordon Technology in 1987 and 1988 respectively. Both systems had the ability to store memory images onto disk snapshots could later be used to restore the Spectrum to its exact previous state. They were both compatible with the Microdrive command syntax, which made porting existing software much simpler.

During the mid-1980s, Telemap Group Ltd launched a fee-based service allowing users to connect their ZX Spectrums via a Prism Micro Products VTX5000 modem to a viewdata service known as Micronet 800, hosted by Prestel, which provided news and information about microcomputers. The service allowed a form of instant messaging and online shopping.

Software 

While games comprised the majority of commercial ZX Spectrum software, there were also programming language implementations, databases (e.g. VU-File), word processors (e.g. Tasword II), spreadsheets (e.g. VU-Calc), drawing and painting tools (e.g. OCP Art Studio), and even 3D-modelling (e.g. VU-3D) and archaeology software.

The early Spectrum models' great success as a games platform came in spite of its lack of built-in joystick ports, primitive sound generation, and colour support that was optimised for text display: the hardware limitations of the platform required a particular level of creativity from video game designers.

From August 1982, the ZX Spectrum came bundled with a software starter pack in the form of a cassette tape entitled Horizons: Software Starter Pack, which included 8 programs: Thro' the Wall (a Breakout clone), Bubblesort, Evolution (an ecosystem of foxes and rabbits), Life (an implementation of Conway's Game of Life), Draw (a basic object-based drawing utility), Monte Carlo (a simulation of the rolling of two dice), Character Generator (for editing user defined graphics), Beating of Waves (plots the sum of two sine waves).

According to the 90th issue of the British gaming magazine GamesMaster, the ten best games released were (in descending order) Head Over Heels, Jet Set Willy, Skool Daze, Renegade, R-Type, Knight Lore, Dizzy, The Hobbit, The Way of the Exploding Fist, and Match Day II.

The last full price, commercial game to be released for the Spectrum was Alternative Software's Dalek Attack, which was released in July 1993.

A homebrew community continues into the present day, with several games being released commercially from new software houses such as Cronosoft.

Distribution 

Most Spectrum software was originally distributed on audio cassette tapes. The Spectrum was intended to work with a normal domestic cassette recorder.

Although the ZX Microdrive was initially greeted with good reviews, it never took off as a distribution method due to worries about the quality of the cartridges and piracy. Hence the main use became to complement tape releases, usually utilities and niche products like the Tasword word processing software and Trans Express, (a tape to microdrive copying utility). No games are known to be exclusively released on Microdrive.

Although the Interface 2 proved popular, the high cost of ROM cartridges, and the fact that they were limited to 16K in size, meant that very few titles were released in this format.

Software was distributed through print media; magazines and books. The reader would type the BASIC program listing into the computer by hand, run it, and could save it to tape for later use. Software distributed in this way was in general simpler and slower than its assembly language counterparts. Magazines printed long lists of checksummed hexadecimal digits with machine code games or tools.

Another software distribution method was to broadcast the audio stream from the cassette on another medium and have users record it onto an audio cassette themselves. In radio or television shows in many European countries, the host would describe a program, instruct the audience to connect a cassette tape recorder to the radio or TV and then broadcast the program over the airwaves in audio format. Some magazines distributed 7" 33 rpm flexidisc records, a variant of regular vinyl records which could be played on a standard record player. These disks were known under various trademarked names including "Floppy ROM", "Flexisoft", and "Discoflex".

Copying and backup 

Many copiers—utilities to copy programs from audio tape to another tape, microdrive tapes, and later on diskettes—were available for the Spectrum. As a response to this, publishers introduced copy protection measures to their software, including different loading schemes. Other methods for copy prevention were also used including asking for a particular word from the documentation included with the game—often a novella such as the Silicon Dreams trilogy—or another physical device distributed with the software—e.g. Lenslok as used in Elite, or the colour-code chart included with Jet Set Willy. Special hardware, such as Romantic Robot's Multiface, was able to dump a copy of the ZX Spectrum RAM to disk/tape at the press of a button, entirely circumventing the copy protection systems.

Most Spectrum software has been converted to current media and is available for download. One popular program for converting Spectrum files from tape is Taper; it allows connecting a cassette tape player to the line in port of a sound card, or—through a simple home-built device—to the parallel port of a PC. Once in files on a host machine, the software can be executed on an emulator.

Community 

The ZX Spectrum enjoyed a very strong community early on. Several commercially published print magazines were dedicated to covering the home computer family and its offshoots including Sinclair User (1982), Your Spectrum (1983) – rebranded as Your Sinclair in 1986, and CRASH (1984). In the early years, the magazines were focused on programming for the system, and carried many articles containing type-in programs and machine code tutorials. Later on they became almost completely game-oriented, starting many of the writing-styles, trends and tropes found in later video-game publications and reviews.

Several other contemporary computer magazines covered the ZX Spectrum as part of their regular coverage of the home computer industry at that time. These included Computer Gamer, Computer and Video Games, Computing Today, Popular Computing Weekly, Your Computer and The Games Machine.

The Spectrum is affectionately known as the Speccy by elements of its fan following.

More than 80 electronic magazines existed, many in Russian. Most notable of them were AlchNews (UK), Enigma Tape Magazine (UK), 16/48 (UK), ZX-Format (Russia), Adventurer (Russia), Microhobby (Spain) and Spectrofon (Russia). These frequently included games, demos, and utilities alongside the magazine content (much like a covertape on a paper magazine).

Notable developers 

A number of notable games developers began their careers on the ZX Spectrum, including David Perry of Shiny Entertainment, and Tim and Chris Stamper (founders of Rare, formerly Ultimate Play the Game, maker of many games for Nintendo and Microsoft game consoles). Other prominent games developers include Julian Gollop (Chaos, Rebelstar, X-COM series), Matthew Smith (Manic Miner, Jet Set Willy), Jon Ritman (Match Day, Head Over Heels), Jonathan "Joffa" Smith (Batman: The Caped Crusader, Mikie, Hyper Sports), The Oliver Twins (the Dizzy series), Clive Townsend (Saboteur), Sandy White (Ant Attack; I, of the Mask), Pete Cooke (Tau Ceti), Mike Singleton (The Lords of Midnight, War in Middle Earth), and Alan Cox. Although the 48K Spectrum's audio hardware was not as capable as chips in other popular 8-bit home computers of the era, computer musicians David Whittaker and Tim Follin produced notable multi-channel music for it.

Jeff Minter ported some of his VIC-20 games to the ZX Spectrum.

Reception 

BYTE in January 1983 acknowledged the appeal of the Spectrum's low £125 price to British consumers and called it a "promising machine". It criticised the keyboard; "inexpensive or not, the ... layout is impossible to justify ... poorly designed in several respects".

Legacy 

On 23 April 2012, a Google doodle honoured the 30th anniversary of the Spectrum. As it coincided with St George's Day, the logo was of St George fighting a dragon in the style of a Spectrum loading screen.

In December 2018, one of the alternate endings in Black Mirror: Bandersnatch included the main character playing data tape audio that, when loaded into a ZX Spectrum software emulator, generates a QR code leading to a website with a playable version of the Nohzdyve game featured in the episode.

Some programmers have continued to code for the platform by using emulators on PCs.

Since 2020, there has been a museum, LOAD ZX Spectrum, dedicated to the ZX Spectrum and other Sinclair products (as well as Timex, Investrónica and many others), located in Cantanhede, Portugal.

See also 

 List of computer system emulators#Sinclair ZX Spectrum and clones
 List of ZX Spectrum games
 ZX Spectrum graphic modes
 ZX Spectrum character set
 Contended memory

References

Additional sources

External links 

 ZX Spectrum BASIC manual
 JSSpeccy 3 ZX Spectrum emulator in the browser

Computer-related introductions in 1982
Computers designed in the United Kingdom
English inventions
Home computers
Products and services discontinued in 1992
Sinclair Research
Z80-based home computers
ZX Spectrum